The Semiotic Society of America is an interdisciplinary professional association serving scholars from many disciplines with common interests in semiotics, the study of signs and sign-systems. It was founded in 1975 and includes members from the United States and Canada. Its official journal is The American Journal of Semiotics. The Society also publishes the proceedings of its annual conferences. Memberships in the society and publication of the journal are managed by the Philosophy Documentation Center.

As its symbol, the Society uses caduceus, the staff of a messenger bearing a message, as a sign of a sign.

Publications of the Semiotic Society of America
 The American Journal of Semiotics, 1981–present
 Semiotics: The Proceedings of the Semiotic Society of America, 1980–present
 Semiotic Scene: Bulletin of the Semiotic Society of America, 1977-1981
 Bulletin of Literary Semiotics, 1975-1977

Presidents
According to the society's official website, the Presidents of the Society have included: 

 1976: Henry Hiz
 1977: Eugen Baer
 1978: Thomas G. Winner
 1979: Max H. Fisch
 1980: Allen Walker Read
 1981: Richard Bauman
 1982: Harley C. Shands
 1983: Irmengard Rauch
 1984: Thomas A. Sebeok
 1985: Donald Preziosi
 1986: Michael Riffaterre
 1987: Naomi S. Baron
 1988: Jonathan Culler
 1989: Bennetta Jules-Rosette
 1990: Robert Scholes
 1991: Linda Waugh
 1992: Nancy Armstrong
 1993: (David Savan - died before taking office)
 1993: Michael Shapiro
 1994: Richard Lanigan
 1995: Eugen Baer
 1996: Roberta Kevelson
 1997: Myrdene Anderson
 1998: Jean Umiker-Sebeok
 1999: Floyd Merrell
 2000: William Pencak
 2001: John Deely
 2002: Paul Perron
 2003: Vincent Colapietro
 2004–2005: Cary William Spinks
 2006: Joseph Brent
 2007: Nathan Houser
 2008: Robert Hatten
 2009: Thomas Broden
 2010: John Coletta
 2011: Frank Nuessel
 2012: Isaac Catt
 2013: André DeTienne
 2014: Elliot Gaines
 2015: Marcel Danesi
 2016 Ted J. Baenziger 
 2017 Deborah Smith-Shank 
 2018 Deborah Eicher-Catt 
 2019 Farouk Y. Seif
 2020 Frank Macke
 2021 Ronald C. Arnett

Honorary members
The "Sebeok fellow" award is the highest honor given by the Semiotic Society of America. The Sebeok fellows are David Savan (1992), John Deely (1993), Paul Bouissac (1996), Jesper Hoffmeyer (2000), Kalevi Kull (2003), Floyd Merrell (2005), Susan Petrilli (2008), Irmengard Rauch (2011), Paul Cobley (2014), Vincent Colapietro (2018), Nathan Houser (2019), Marcel Danesi (2020).

See also
International Association for Semiotic Studies

References

External links
 
 List of Past SSA Presidents
 The American Journal of Semiotics
 Semiotics: The Proceedings of the Semiotic Society of America
 Philosophy Documentation Center

Society of America, Semiotic